"Brother from Another Series" is the sixteenth episode of the eighth season of the American animated television series The Simpsons. It originally aired on the Fox network in the United States on February 23, 1997. Sideshow Bob is released from prison after his arrest in "Sideshow Bob's Last Gleaming" into the care of his brother Cecil and claims to be a changed man. However, Bart does not believe him and tries to find out what Bob is up to. It was the first episode directed by Pete Michels and was written by Ken Keeler. The episode guest stars Kelsey Grammer in his sixth appearance as Sideshow Bob and David Hyde Pierce in his first appearance as Cecil. The title is not only a pun on the movie The Brother from Another Planet (used for a previous episode as well), but for the fact that guest stars Kelsey Grammer and David Hyde Pierce also played bickering brothers Frasier Crane and Niles Crane, respectively, on the NBC sitcom Frasier.

Plot
Krusty the Clown is performing live from the Springfield Prison and he talks to Sideshow Bob, who tells him of his crimes while trying to kill Bart Simpson after framing Krusty for armed robbery. Bob is later declared a changed man by Reverend Lovejoy and leaves prison on a work-release program, despite Bart's protests that Bob has tried to kill him several times. Although they have not spoken for ten years, Bob is taken into the care of his brother Cecil. Since he is Springfield's chief hydrological and hydrodynamical engineer, Cecil employs Bob to supervise the construction of a hydroelectric dam in a river near the town. Bart, believing Bob is still plotting his murder, follows his every move. Bob — annoyed by Bart's intrusions and the dam's incompetent laborers, Cletus and his family — expresses his desire to see the dam burst and obliterate Springfield.

While searching Bob's trailer at the dam construction site, Bart and Lisa discover a briefcase full of cash. When confronted with the money, Bob denies knowing about it, stating he used his finances to put concrete in the dam's walls — which he discovers are hollow and poorly constructed. Cecil arrives armed and reveals his own intention to embezzle the money from the project, and his plans to frame Bob as the scapegoat when the dam collapses from shoddy construction. Cecil's motivation for the crime is being upstaged at his audition as Krusty's sidekick (his dream job since he was five-years-old) ten years prior by Bob, who was chosen as the clown's sidekick instead. Cecil locks Bob, Bart and Lisa in the dam and prepares to blow it up, taking the money with him.

Deciding to work together, Bart, Lisa, and Bob escape and try to save the dam. While Lisa and Bob defuse Cecil's dynamite, Bart lunges at Cecil before he can press the plunger. Cecil attempts to swat him off with the briefcase, which falls open and scatters money over the river below, washing it away. Cecil throws Bart off a cliff, but Bob grabs the dynamite's chord and swoops down to save him. As the two dangle over the side of the dam, Bob cuts the cord on the dynamite to prevent Cecil from destroying the town. Bob and Bart plummet down the dam's wall, but a protruding pipe stops their fall.

The police arrive and arrest Cecil. Bob gloats over his victory, having gained the respect of Bart and Lisa, but Chief Wiggum arrests Bob, despite Bart and Lisa's protests that he is reformed. As they are taken away, Cecil tricks Bob into swearing revenge and incriminating himself. The dam then crumbles and releases a torrent of water on Springfield, but does only minimal damage. In jail, Bob and Cecil bicker over who gets the top bunk and Bob wins when he pushes Cecil onto the floor, only for Cecil to ask him if they get any menus.

Production

The episode was written by Ken Keeler, who had been watching a lot of Frasier episodes at the time and had been assigned to write a Sideshow Bob episode and he thought it would be a good idea to mix the two. David Hyde Pierce was cast as Sideshow Bob's brother, causing Pierce to joke, "Normally, I would not do something like this. But how often do you get a chance to work with an actor like Kelsey Grammer and, more importantly, play his brother?" While Sideshow Bob is addressing the crowd, a man near the back raises his hand and says "probably"; he is also voiced by David Hyde Pierce, who had wanted to be a man in a crowd.

An early draft of the episode originally featured an opera house explosion, which was changed because the writers felt using a dam would be more exciting. An early rule of Sideshow Bob episodes was to recap what had gone on in previous Bob episodes, in case the viewer had forgotten who he was. The original script was run by the Frasier producers to make sure they were okay with it, and they only had one problem. There was a very brief scene in which Cecil talks to a visible character and refers to her as "Maris", who in Frasier is an unseen character, and the producers of Frasier said the scene should go. The writers spent a long time trying to figure out a civilization that considered chief hydrological engineer a true calling and chose the Cappadocians, who were famous for underground cities although not specifically dams.

Cecil was drawn to resemble Pierce, but still look similar to Bob. According to director Pete Michels, it was difficult to draw Bob and Cecil standing together because their feet are both so big. There was a scene featuring Hans Moleman and his house, which was cut, but his house can still briefly be seen in the scene where Cecil throws Bart off a cliff. The sequence was cut in order to make room for the explanation of why Bob was sent back to prison. Ken Keeler has said that it is his favorite deleted scene.

Cultural references

The "Krusty the Clown Prison Special" is based on Johnny Cash's 1968 appearance at Folsom Prison. Krusty's song is a parody of "Folsom Prison Blues". The mention of Arthur Fiedler's wake is an apparent reference and parody of Frasier Crane's upper class Seattle lifestyle. The episode contains several references to Frasier, with the intention of making it obvious that The Simpsons was parodying the series. These include a title card just before the start of the second act which says "Frasier is a hit show on the NBC television network" in a similar typeface and style as Frasiers intertitles, with jazz music playing over it as it does in the series.  When Bart jumps on Cecil and says "guess who", Cecil replies with "Maris?" Cecil's inability to see Bart also refers to the fact that Maris, Niles' wife in Frasier, is never actually seen.

Reception
In its original broadcast, "Brother from Another Series" finished 39th in ratings for the week of February 17–23, 1997, with a Nielsen rating of 9.1, equivalent to approximately 8.8 million viewing households. It was the fourth highest-rated show on the Fox network that week, following The X-Files, King of the Hill and Melrose Place.

Beforehand, the media said the episode "looks promising", and afterwards journalist Ben Rayner called it one of director Peter Michels' "classics". This episode was nominated for a Primetime Emmy Award for Sound Mixing for a Comedy Series or Special. In a 2008 article, Entertainment Weekly named Pierce's role as Cecil as one of the sixteen best guest appearances on The Simpsons. Grammer and Pierce were ranked second on AOL's list of their favorite 25 Simpsons guest stars.

References

External links

The Simpsons (season 8) episodes
Frasier
1997 American television episodes
Television episodes written by Ken Keeler
Television episodes about revenge
Television episodes about murder